Busk is a hamlet in Cumbria, England.

See also
List of places in Cumbria

References

Hamlets in Cumbria
Kirkoswald, Cumbria